Ou Dongni (born 7 February 1993) is a badminton player from China. She won the 2015 Singapore Super Series with Yu Xiaohan.

Achievements

East Asian Games 
Women's doubles

BWF World Junior Championships 
Girls' doubles

Asian Junior Championships 
Girls' doubles

Mixed doubles

BWF Superseries 
The BWF Superseries, which was launched on 14 December 2006 and implemented in 2007, is a series of elite badminton tournaments, sanctioned by the Badminton World Federation (BWF). BWF Superseries levels are Superseries and Superseries Premier. A season of Superseries consists of twelve tournaments around the world that have been introduced since 2011. Successful players are invited to the Superseries Finals, which are held at the end of each year.

Women's doubles

  Superseries Finals Tournament
  Superseries Premier Tournament
  Superseries Tournament

BWF Grand Prix 
The BWF Grand Prix had two levels, the BWF Grand Prix and Grand Prix Gold. It was a series of badminton tournaments sanctioned by the Badminton World Federation (BWF) which was held from 2007 to 2017.

Women's doubles

  Grand Prix Gold Tournament
  Grand Prix Tournament

BWF International Challenge/Series 
Women's doubles

Mixed doubles

  BWF International Challenge tournament
  BWF International Series tournament

References 

1993 births
Living people
Badminton players from Guangdong
Chinese female badminton players
Universiade medalists in badminton
Universiade silver medalists for China
Medalists at the 2015 Summer Universiade
21st-century Chinese women